Shelley Lubben (May 18, 1968 – February 9, 2019) was an American author, singer, motivational speaker, and pornographic actress. As a performer in the adult film industry, she was known professionally as Roxy. After she left the sex industry, Lubben became a born-again Christian and anti-pornography activist. From 2008 to 2016, she was the executive director of the Pink Cross Foundation, which reaches out to women and men in pornography and speaks in public forums, sharing about the hazardous working conditions that she experienced in the porn industry.  In January 2016, she closed the Pink Cross Foundation. She was also an ordained Chaplain with the Order of Saint Martin with a degree in Theological studies.

Early life 
Lubben was born on May 18, 1968 in Pasadena, California. In an interview with Howard Stern and Deseret News, Lubben stated that when she was nine years old, a Female classmate and her teenage brother sexually abused her in a swimming  pool. Lubben worked as a prostitute from age 18 to 26. During this time, she became pregnant by one of her customers, and later gave birth to a daughter.

Career

Adult industry 
Lubben entered the adult film industry, while working as a prostitute, when she was 24 years old. During her time in the sex industry, she contracted herpes and HPV, which led to cervical cancer, and resulted in the removal of half her cervix. During and after her life in the sex industry, she battled alcohol and drug addictions. During her pornographic career, which lasted from 1993–1994, Lubben appeared in about 15 hardcore movies. Lubben stated that the sex acts that women perform on film sets are physically harmful (including anal and uterine hemorrhaging), and psychologically traumatizing.

Advocacy 

In 2005, Lubben initiated an aggressive online marketing campaign, utilizing social networking web sites in order to reach out to the sex industry. In 2008, Lubben established a faith-based organization called the Pink Cross Foundation. The group concentrated on outreach to and evangelism of those in the porn industry, especially performers, and offers support to those wishing to leave the industry. The organization solicited donations online and offered an online support forum for individuals that are addicted to drugs, sex, and pornography. When Lubben identified interested individuals, she sent care packages filled with religious literature, bibles, Christian music, local grocery and department store gift cards, and other spiritual and practical supports. A secondary focus of Pink Cross was outreach to individuals seeking recovery from pornography addiction. Pink Cross attended pornography conventions to educate fans about how porn is not glamorous and also reaching out to porn stars and reminding them that they have options.

The Pink Cross Foundation also lobbied against pornography and the adult entertainment industry. Lubben supported California legislator Charles Calderon in his effort to tax the pornographic industry by speaking to lawmakers about her experiences. Lubben indicated that the scenes on the set of a hardcore porn film often involve a woman and several men who are doing degrading acts to the woman. Lubben described the scene of a hardcore porn film as devoid of intimacy, and described it as "all mechanical and beastly". She further wrote that "women are vomiting off the set, and most of the actors are doing drugs and alcohol." In June 2010, she spoke to U.S. House and Senate members and their staffs in Washington DC about the damage that was done to her body from her time in the porn industry. Moreover Lubben was outspoken regarding the illegal and hazardous working conditions in the industry, with sexually transmitted diseases being a workplace safety issue and public health concern.

, Lubben was presenting her personal experiences in the adult film industry in public forums and speaking out about her recovery process and the emotional, mental, and physical effects of pornography on performers. In February 2011, she spoke at Cambridge University, where she presented on the harmful effects of pornography and debated the issue with advocates speaking on behalf of the pornography industry.

In January 2013, Swiss recording artist and model Patrick Nuo publicly claimed that Lubben helped him deal with his pornography addiction.

In January 2016, the Pink Cross Foundation shut down.

Media appearances 
Lubben appeared in various international media outlets, including radio, television, and film. An overview of her life has been featured in the documentaries Traffic Control and Out of the Darkness, the latter of which was selected to be the opening film for the John Paul II Film Festival in 2011.

Lubben was also in the 2012 documentary After Porn Ends, which is about life after being in the porn industry. In February 2011, she became the subject of a documentary entitled, The Devil and Shelley Lubben, created by porn industry advocate Michael Whiteacre. According to Mark Kernes of the adult industry trade journal AVN, the film disputes Lubben's experiences in pornography and the trauma she says can be traced to those experiences. In June 2012, Lubben shared her life story in Slovakia to local media outlets.

Recording background 
In January 2011, Lubben released a rap/hip hop album with the proceeds going to the Pink Cross Foundation to help women and men recover from porn. The first single, titled "Killer Fantasy", features the message of a porn star speaking to the porn fan about the truth behind the adult industry.

Death 
Lubben died on February 9, 2019, in Springville, California at the age of 50. No cause was given.

Published work 
 Lubben, Shelley. Truth Behind the Fantasy of Porn: The Greatest Illusion on Earth, CreateSpace, 2010.

See also 
Anti-pornography movement
Crissy Moran, another former pornographic actress who advocates against the adult industry

References

External links 

 
 
 

1968 births
2019 deaths
20th-century American women
20th-century Christians
21st-century American non-fiction writers
21st-century American women writers
21st-century Christians
Activists from California
Actresses from Pasadena, California
American Christian writers
American evangelicals
Anti-pornography activists
Anti–human trafficking activists
Christians from California
Converts to Christianity
Writers from Pasadena, California
American women non-fiction writers